Windowing may refer to:
Windowing system, a graphical user interface (GUI) which implements windows as a primary metaphor
In signal processing, the application of a window function to a signal
In computer networking, a flow control mechanism to manage the amount of transmitted data sent without receiving an acknowledgement (e.g. TCP windowing)
Date windowing, a method to interpret a two-digit year as a regular four-digit year, see Year 2000 problem
Address Windowing Extensions, a Microsoft Windows Application Programming Interface
A process used to produce images in a computed tomography (CT) scan
A method of publication wherein a work is published on different media at different times (e.g. first in cinemas, then on Blu-ray)

See also
Window (disambiguation)
Windows (disambiguation)